Philip Sidney Smith (28 July 1877 - 10 May 1949) was an American geologist and specialist in the geology of Alaska.

On 28 July 1877, Smith was born in Medford, Massachusetts. He attended Harvard University, and under the influence of Nathaniel Shaler, entered the field of geology. He earned his Ph.D. from Harvard in 1904, and joined the Alaskan division of the United States Geological Survey in 1906 under Alfred H. Brooks. In 1925, he was promoted to Chief Alaskan Geologist.

In 1929, he served as an official delegate to the Fourth Pacific Scientific Congress in Java, and in 1937, he was Chairman of the US delegation to the Seventeenth International Geological Congress in the Soviet Union. He served as Governor of the Arctic Institute of North America from 1944 until his death.

Smith died of pneumonia on 10 May 1949 in St. Albans, Vermont. He was buried in Wolfeboro, New Hampshire.

Legacy
The Philip Smith Mountains were named for Smith in 1950.

References

Further reading

1877 births
1949 deaths
People from Medford, Massachusetts
Harvard University alumni
American geologists
United States Geological Survey personnel
Deaths from pneumonia in Vermont
Burials in New Hampshire
Geology of Alaska